The Museum of Aeronautical Science (航空科学博物館) is an aviation museum located in Shibayama, Chiba prefecture, Japan. It is near Narita International Airport. It opened in 1989.

Outdoor display area

 Cessna 195
 Mitsubishi MU-2
 Fuji/Rockwell Commander 700
 NAMC YS-11
 Sikorsky S-62
 Kamov Ka-26
 Cessna 411
 Beechcraft Bonanza
 Learjet
 Aero Commander 680
 Robinson R22
 Cessna 175

References

External links
 Museum of Aeronautical Sciences 
 Museum of Aeronautical Science – Narita City Sightseeing Guide
 Airport Spotting - Museum of Aeronautical Science, Narita, Japan

History museums in Japan
Aerospace museums in Japan
Museums in Chiba Prefecture
Museums established in 1989
1989 establishments in Japan
Shibayama, Chiba